Shugoshin 1 or Shugoshin-like 1, is a protein that in humans is encoded by the SGO1 gene.

Model organisms

Model organisms have been used in the study of SGOL1 function. A conditional knockout mouse line, called Sgol1tm1a(EUCOMM)Wtsi has been generated.

Male and female animals underwent a standardized phenotypic screen to determine the effects of deletion. Twenty six tests were carried out on mutant mice and three significant abnormalities were observed. No homozygous mutant embryos were identified during gestation, and thus none survived until weaning. The remaining tests were carried out on heterozygous mutant adult mice and a decreased regulatory T cell number was observed in male animals.

Mechanisms 

A physical mechanism that guarantees the accurate segregation of sister chromatids during mitosis arises from the ring shaped cohesin complex consisting of 4 subunits (SMC1A/B, SMC3, SCC1, and SA1/2 in humans).  This complex encircles the two sister chromatids and resists the pulling force of microtubules. The characteristic X-shape chromosomes are formed due to the centromeric cohesin protected by Shugoshin-PP2A complex.

Kinetochore localization of Sgo1-PP2A is dependent upon phosphorylation on histone H2A of nucleosome, which is the important substrate of spindle checkpoint kinase BUB1. Centromeric cohesin and H2A-pT120 specify two distinct pools of Sgo1-PP2A at inner centromeres and kinetochores respectively, while the CDK1/cyclin B phosphorylation on Sgo1 is essential for Sgo1-PP2A to protect centromeric cohesin, not only for bringing PP2A to cohesin, but also physically shield out the negative regulator WAPAL from cohesin.

References

Further reading 

 
 
 
 
 
 
 
 
 
 

Genes mutated in mice